Antonius "Antoine" Hendrikus Mazairac (24 May 1901 – 1 September 1966) was a Dutch cyclist who competed in the 1928 Summer Olympics. He won the silver medal in the sprint competition.

See also
 List of Dutch Olympic cyclists

References

External links

1901 births
1966 deaths
Dutch male cyclists
Dutch track cyclists
Olympic cyclists of the Netherlands
Cyclists at the 1928 Summer Olympics
Olympic silver medalists for the Netherlands
Sportspeople from Roosendaal
Olympic medalists in cycling
Medalists at the 1928 Summer Olympics
Cyclists from North Brabant
20th-century Dutch people